
Gmina Gierałtowice is a rural gmina (administrative district) in Gliwice County, Silesian Voivodeship, in southern Poland.

Villages
Gmina Gierałtowice contains the villages of Chudów, Gierałtowice, Paniówki and Przyszowice.

Neighbouring gminas
Gmina Gierałtowice is bordered by the towns of Gliwice, Knurów, Mikołów, Ruda Śląska and Zabrze, and by the gmina of Ornontowice.

Twin towns – sister cities

Gmina Gierałtowice is twinned with:
 Uherský Brod, Czech Republic

References

Gieraltowice
Gliwice County